Xiangyang is a town of Wuchang, Harbin, Heilongjiang, China. , it has 17 villages under its administration.

References

Township-level divisions of Heilongjiang
Wuchang, Heilongjiang